The Cavalier is a 1928 American silent Western film directed by Irvin Willat, distributed by Tiffany Studios, and starring Richard Talmadge and Barbara Bedford.

Plot
The story takes place in old Mexico, where a masked rider (Talmadge) and an impoverished girl (Bedford) fall in love, against her father's wishes. When she leaves with him, her father sends his gang in a chase after the two lovers.

Cast

Background/Production
Originally intended to be an all-sound film, the picture was shot silent and was distributed with a music and special effects soundtrack, with no dialogue, due to technical issues with the sound synchronization equipment.

Preservation
Previously considered to be a lost film, the film exists in the Spanish archive Filmoteca de Catalunya, Barcelona.

References

External links
 
 
 

1928 films
1928 Western (genre) films
1920s rediscovered films
American black-and-white films
Films directed by Irvin Willat
Films set in Mexico
Rediscovered American films
Silent American Western (genre) films
Tiffany Pictures films
Transitional sound Western (genre) films
1920s American films